Prabhat Jha is an Indian politician. He has been a member of the Rajya Sabha from Madhya Pradesh state in India. He used to be the Madhya Pradesh Bharatiya Janata Party President in 2010 until December 2012. Presently he is the National Vice President of the Bharatiya Janata Party.

Jha is also editor of BJP mouthpiece Kamal Sandesh.

Background, family and education
Jha was born in Village Koriyahi, Sitamarhi district, Bihar. He did his schooling from Gwalior, Madhya Pradesh India. He was a journalist before joining politics.

Jha is married to Ranjana Jha and they have two sons.

External links

References

Living people
1957 births
Rajya Sabha members from Madhya Pradesh
Bharatiya Janata Party politicians from Bihar
People from Darbhanga district
Rajya Sabha members from the Bharatiya Janata Party
Bharatiya Janata Party politicians from Madhya Pradesh